Sondra van Ert (born 9 March 1964) is an American snowboarder.

She was born in Des Moines, Iowa. She competed at the 1998 Winter Olympics in giant slalom earning 12th place, and the 2002 Winter Olympics in parallel giant slalom, earning 17th place. Her achievements at the World Championships include a gold medal in the giant slalom in 1997, and bronze medals in 1996 and 1999.

References

External links 
 

1964 births
Living people
People from Des Moines, Iowa
American female snowboarders
Olympic snowboarders of the United States
Snowboarders at the 1998 Winter Olympics
Snowboarders at the 2002 Winter Olympics
Universiade silver medalists for the United States
Universiade medalists in alpine skiing
Competitors at the 1987 Winter Universiade
21st-century American women